Wuzhou Wu (婺州話 or 務州片) is a Southern Wu Chinese language spoken in and around Jinhua in Zhejiang province. It is at best only poorly intelligible with Taihu Wu. Wuzhou Wu is named after the ancient Wuzhou County that existed in modern-day Jinhua.

Dialects
Jinhua is the chief and representative dialect of Wuzhou. 
Jinhua dialect
Lanxi dialect
Pujiang dialect
Yiwu dialect
Dongyang dialect
Pan'an dialect
Yongkang dialect
Wuyi dialect
Jiande dialect

References

Wu Chinese